Chrysocrata is a genus of moths belonging to the family Tineidae that is found in Madagascar.

There is only one species in this genus: Chrysocrata coruscans  Gozmány, 1969.

References

Gozmány, L. A. 1969d. Some Tineid moths (Lepidoptera) from Madagascar. - Acta Zoologica Academiae Scientiarum Hungaricae 15(3–4):287–297.

Tineidae
Tineidae genera